Elvin Jones Music Machine is a live album by drummer Elvin Jones recorded in 1978 and originally released on the audio manufacturer Mark Levinson label as an audiophile disc.

Track listing
 "Shi-Tsu-Mon" (Frank Foster) - 7:22   
 "Like Someone in Love" (Jimmy van Heusen, Johnny Burke) - 9:50   
 "Dealin'" (Gene Perla) - 12:54   
 "My One and Only Love" (Guy Wood, Robert Mellin) - 8:33

Personnel
Elvin Jones  - drums
Pat LaBarbera - tenor saxophone, soprano saxophone
Frank Foster - tenor saxophone
Roland Prince - guitar 
Andy McCloud - bass

References

Elvin Jones live albums
1978 live albums